Syed Muhammad Moshin is a Bangladesh Nationalist Party politician and the former Member of Parliament of Dhaka-11.

Career
Moshin was elected to parliament from Dhaka-11 as a Bangladesh Nationalist Party candidate in 1992 in a by-election following the death of the previous Member of Parliament, Harun Rashid Mollah, in office.

References

Bangladesh Nationalist Party politicians
Living people
8th Jatiya Sangsad members
Year of birth missing (living people)